Mamuka Magrakvelidze (born 12 August 1977) is a Georgian rugby union player, currently playing in the French professional Pro D2, for the Tarbes Pyrénées Rugby club. He previously played for other French clubs, the Montpellier Hérault RC and the Racing Metro 92 Paris.

Magrakvelidze is also an international player for the Georgia national team. He played for Georgia at the 2007 Rugby World Cup in France.

Notes

1977 births
Rugby union players from Georgia (country)
Living people
Expatriate rugby union players from Georgia (country)
Expatriate rugby union players in France
Expatriate sportspeople from Georgia (country) in France
Georgia international rugby union players
Rugby union props